The 2015 FIFA Women's World Cup qualification UEFA play-offs decided the eighth and final UEFA qualifier for the 2015 FIFA Women's World Cup.

Format
After conclusion of the group stage the four runners-up with the best record against the sides first, third, fourth and fifth in their groups played home and away matches, to determine the last participant in the FIFA World Cup.

For each play-off tie, the team that scored more goals on aggregate over the two legs qualified for the final tournament. If the aggregate score was level, the away goals rule applied, i.e., the team that scored more goals away from home over the two legs advanced. If away goals were also equal, then thirty minutes of extra time would be played, divided into two fifteen-minutes halves. The away goals rule was again applied after extra time, i.e., if there are goals scored during extra time and the aggregate score was still level, the visiting team advanced by virtue of more away goals scored. If no goals were scored during extra time, the tie would be decided by penalty shoot-out.

Ranking of second-placed teams
Matches against the sixth-placed team in each group are not included in this ranking. As a result, eight matches played by each team counted for the purposes of the second-placed table.

The ranking of the runners-up is determined by the following parameters in this order:
Highest number of points
Goal difference
Highest number of goals scored
Highest number of away goals scored
Position in the UEFA national team coefficient ranking system;

Draw
The draw was held on 23 September 2014 at 14:00 local time at Nyon, Switzerland.

Seeding
In the play-off draw, teams were seeded according to their UEFA Women's National Team Coefficient Ranking (shown in brackets).

Bracket

All times are CEST (UTC+02:00) during summer and CET (UTC+01:00) during winter.

Semifinals

|}

Netherlands won 4–1 on aggregate and advanced to final.

Italy won 4–3 on aggregate and advanced to final.

Final

|}

Netherlands won 3–2 on aggregate and qualified for 2015 FIFA Women's World Cup.

Goalscorers
3 goals
 Melania Gabbiadini
 Vivianne Miedema

2 goals

 Lieke Martens
 Manon Melis
 Vira Dyatel

1 goal

 Valentina Cernoia
 Patrizia Panico
 Kim Little
 Daryna Apanaschenko

Own goal
 Stefanie van der Gragt (playing against Italy)

References

External links
Women's World Cup – UEFA play-off semi-final, UEFA.com
Women's World Cup – UEFA play-off final, UEFA.com

play-offs
2014 in Scottish women's football
play
2013–14 in Italian women's football
2013–14 in Ukrainian football